Wah Gardens, also known as Mughal Garden Wah, is a garden-complex dating back to the era of the Mughal Emperor Akbar the Great (1542-1605), located at Wah village, of Hasan Abdal, in Punjab, Pakistan. The site was largely abandoned after Mughal rule, and while it lay in ruins for a number of years, it is now being restored by the Pakistan Department of Archaeology.

Location 
The gardens are in the old village of Wah, close to the present garrison town of Wah, located 50 km north west of Islamabad on the main Grand Trunk Road.

History
Raja Man Singh, brother-in-law of Emperor Jahangir, was a court chief of Emperor Akbar, and is credited with construction of the gardens along the old route from Lahore to Srinagar. He was posted at Wah from the year 1581 to 1586 to stop enemy incursions. During his stay he made a pond surrounded by a structure of twelve doors. The Mughal Emperor Jahangir while on his way to Kabul stayed here on 29 April 1607 and went fishing in the pond. Indeed, the present old village of Wah was originally called 'Jalal Sar' after Jalal Khan Khattar but was renamed 'Wah' by Jahangir.

He wrote in his autobiography (translation): "Stayed at Baba Hasanabdal on 12th Muharram, 1016 A.H. At about two miles on the eastern side of this place there is a waterfall. The water falls with great speed. The center of the pond has the main exiting of the waterfall. Raja Maan Singh has made a very little building. There is a lot of fish in the pond having a length of quarter yard. I stayed at this beautiful place for three days. I put the net in the pond and caught about 10 to 12 fish. These fish were again dropped in the water after sewing pearls in their noses".

The Emperor Shah Jahan stayed at Wah while on his way to Kabul in 1639. He called his central construction department and ordered the reconstruction of the buildings. Ahmed Maamar Lahoree, a  famous architect of those days, planned out the gardens, palaces and inns. The construction was performed under his supervision and took two years. The garden was made in the Mughal construction style. He made beautiful twelve door structures, canals and waterfalls. He made bathrooms having mixture of cold and hot water at the southern end of these twelve-door structures. The inner portion of the structures has been plastered. The walls of the smaller rooms have been decorated with flowers and petals.

Shah Jahan stayed at the gardens on his trips to Kabul four times after their completion: in 1646, 1647, 1649, and 1654. Contemporaries of Shah Jahan, namely Abdul Hameed Lahoree and Muhammad Saleh Kamboh, declared the garden as a trustee of heaven and substitute for heaven's garden on earth.
 
The Mughal Emperor Aurangzeb stayed at the garden in July 1676. The garden was badly damaged in the era of the Durrani Empire (1747–1826) and later Sikh rule (1826-1849). After the annexation of the Punjab, the British Government handed over the gardens to Nawab Muhammad Hayat Khan, CSI, in 1865.

Restoration and maintenance
Considering the historical importance of the gardens and their artistic construction, the Government of Pakistan handed over the garden to the department of Archeology to look after. It was decades later when on the request of Lt Gen Omar Mahmood Hayat, Chairman POF Wah, the Archeology department initiated repairs. Work has been started to restore and save the garden.

The reconstruction of the four walls of the garden, the big pond, the canals, and the paths are near completion. The work of replanting the trees that were there in Mughal days, repairs of the twelve-door structures, the bathrooms and waterfalls will be completed soon.
Once completed, the gardens are expected to return to their former state.

Gallery

References

Mughal gardens in Pakistan
Mughal terraced gardens
Attock District